Paul Lee (born 16 April 1961) is a Canadian former international soccer player who played as a defender.

References

1961 births
Living people
Canadian soccer players
Canada men's international soccer players
Association football defenders